From the independence of the United States until today, various movements within Canada have campaigned in favour of U.S. annexation of parts or all of Canada. Historical studies have focused on numerous small-scale movements which are helpful in comparisons of Canadian and American politics.

In the early years of the United States, many American political figures were in favour of invading and annexing Canada, and even pre-approved Canada's admission to the U.S. in the Articles of Confederation in 1777. The defeat of American attempts to achieve this goal, both in the American Revolutionary War and the War of 1812, gradually led to the abandonment in the U.S. of any serious push toward annexation. As historian Joseph Levitt notes:

Surveys have suggested that a very small minority of Canadians would potentially support annexation, ranging from as many as 20 percent in a survey by Léger Marketing in 2001 to as few as seven percent in another survey by the same company in 2004.

No elected member of any federal or provincial assembly in Canada, nor any mainstream politician in the United States, openly advocates annexation. Two minor provincial political parties in Canada promoted the concept in the 1980s, but neither attracted widespread support or attention.

Historical annexationist groups

1837
Historical annexationist movements inside Canada were usually inspired by dissatisfaction with Britain's colonial government of Canada. Groups of Irish immigrants took the route of armed struggle, attempting to annex the peninsula between the Detroit and Niagara Rivers to the U.S. by force in the minor and short-lived Patriot War in 1837–1838.

Although the Rebellions of 1837 were motivated in part by this type of dissatisfaction, Canadian resentment of British rule never reached the degree that led to the American Revolution in 1775. Notably, Canada's population growth in the late 18th and early 19th centuries was spurred largely by United Empire Loyalists, who left the American colonies during the Revolution because of their loyalty to Great Britain. In the period from 1790 to 1837, imperial officials repeatedly denounced American-style republicanism and tried to suppress it. The Rebellions themselves were not fought with the goal of annexation, however, but were launched in pursuit of political independence from Britain and liberal social reforms.

Between 1848 and 1854, a significant and articulate minority of conservatives in Upper Canada advocated constitutional changes modelled on the American federal-state system and the US Constitution. They critiqued Canada's imitation of British parliamentary government as both too democratic and too tyrannical. It destroyed the independence of the appointed governor and Legislative Council and further concentrated power in the Cabinet. This critique led many conservatives to argue that the American model of checks and balances offered Canada a more balanced and conservative form of democracy than did British parliamentary government. These "republican conservatives" debated a series of constitutional changes, including annexation to the United States, an elected governor, an elected Legislative Council, a federal union of British North America, and imperial federation, within this framework. These conservatives had accepted "government by discussion" as the appropriate basis for political order.

1850s
Around 1850 there was a serious annexationist movement on the border region of Quebec's Eastern Townships, where the American-descended majority felt that union with the United States would end their economic isolation and stagnation as well as remove them from the growing threat of French Canadian political domination. Leading proponents of this genuinely bipartisan movement were careful not to appear disloyal to Britain, however, and they actively discouraged popular protest at the local level. Fearful of American-style democracy, the local elite also expressed revulsion toward American slavery and militaristic expansionism. Consequently, the movement died as quickly in the Eastern Townships as it did in Montreal after Britain expressed its official disapproval and trade with the United States began to increase.

In Montreal at midcentury, with little immigration and complaints that the repeal of the Corn Laws had cut the region off from its British trade links, a small but organized group supported integrating the colonies into the United States. The leading organization advocating merger was the Annexation Association, founded in 1849 by an alliance of French Canadian nationalists and Anglophone businessmen in Montreal who had a common interest in the republic. Many of its members, including Louis-Joseph Papineau, were participants in the 1837-38 rebellions.

The Montreal Annexation Manifesto was published in 1849. It was hoped a merger with the United States would give Canada markets for its goods, ensure national security, and provide the finances to develop the west. A half measure was the Canadian–American Reciprocity Treaty of 1854 that linked the two areas economically.

However, the movement died out in 1854. Annexation was never a very popular choice. Many Canadians were loyal to the Crown and Great Britain, especially the descendants of the United Empire Loyalists.  French Canadians worried about being an even smaller minority in a larger union, and were concerned about American anti-Catholicism.  The American Civil War, further, convinced many Canadians that the American experiment was a failure.

1860s

British Columbia

United States Secretary of State William Seward predicted in 1860 that western British North America, from Manitoba to British Columbia, would with Russian Alaska join the United States. Many in Britain, such as Goldwin Smith and The Times of London, were pessimistic about the future of British North America and agreed with Seward; The Times said that Britain would only object if the United States attempted to take the territory by force. In the late 1860s, residents of British Columbia, which was not yet a Canadian province, responded to the United States' purchase of Alaska with fear of being surrounded by American territory. Some residents wanted the colony to be the next American purchase. Local opinion was divided, as the three Vancouver Island newspapers supported annexation to the United States, while the three mainland newspapers rejected the idea. Even opponents of the annexation scheme admitted that Great Britain had neglected the region and that grievances were justified. Nonetheless, annexation sentiment disappeared within a few months and prominent leaders moved toward confederation with Canada.

Petitions circulated in favour of American annexation. The first, in 1867, was addressed to Queen Victoria, demanding that the British government assume the colony's debts and establish a steamer link, or allow the colony to join the U.S. In 1869, a second petition was addressed to President Ulysses S. Grant, asking him to negotiate American annexation of the territory from Britain. It was delivered to Grant by Vincent Colyer, Indian Commissioner for Alaska, on December 29, 1869. Both petitions were signed by only a small fraction of the colony's population, and British Columbia was ultimately admitted as a Canadian province in 1871.

Nova Scotia
Most Canadians were strongly opposed to the prospect of American annexation. Reports of the Annexation Bill of 1866 — a bill that, contrary to myth, never came to a vote — might have been one of the many factors behind Canadian Confederation in 1867.  Much more serious were the Fenian raids made by Irish Americans across the border in 1866, which spurred a wave of patriotic feeling that helped the cause of Confederation.

Nonetheless, a substantial annexation movement existed in Nova Scotia, and to a lesser degree in New Brunswick, Quebec, and Ontario, during the 1860s. Nova Scotia anti-confederationists led by Joseph Howe felt that pro-confederation premier Charles Tupper had caused the province to agree to join Canada without popular support. Howe in London unsuccessfully attempted to persuade the government to free Nova Scotia from the pending British North America Act by threatening American annexation. A significant economic downturn occurred after the end after 1866 of the Reciprocity Treaty of 1854; the colony was heavily dependent on selling fish to Americans, causing many to believe that free trade with the United States was necessary for prosperity. Anti-confederationists won all but two seats in the 1867 provincial election; as in British Columbia they did not necessarily support annexation. They again sent Howe to London to free Nova Scotia but in 1868 the British government again refused, believing that New Brunswick would likely follow Nova Scotia out of the dominion and cause the new nation to collapse.

Angry Nova Scotians began talking seriously of annexation. An alarmed Howe—who wished Nova Scotia to be free of Canada but still with Britain—warned his supporters against disloyalty, dividing anti-confederationists. The provincial government, dominated by extremists who now also opposed Howe, decided that if another appeal to London failed it would seize federal offices and unilaterally declare annexation, believing that Britain would not use force to stop Nova Scotia. Believing he had no choice, Howe left the anti-confederationists. Although he narrowly won reelection to his federal parliamentary seat in March 1869 as a confederationist, support for secession and annexation grew that year; however, by 1871 the movement had mostly disappeared. The federal government promised changes to taxes and tariffs, the economy revived, and the United States agreed to free trade for Canadian fish.

1880s
A Quebec-born homeopathic physician, Prosper Bender, expressed disappointment with the Canadian experiment in the 1880s and 1890s. An author and the former host of a literary circle in Quebec City, Bender suddenly moved to Boston in 1882. After celebrating the promise of Confederation, he became a strong proponent of annexation to the United States and something of an intercultural broker; he helped interpret French-Canadian culture to American readers. Bender wrote in the North American Review in 1883 that many Canadians believed that annexation by the United States would occur "within the present generation, if not sooner". He believed that Irish Catholics—about one quarter of Canada's population—would prefer annexation because of the British rule of Ireland. They would be joined by the majority of those under 40, who viewed the United States as a prosperous, fast-growing neighbour providing many opportunities. (The author attributed the absence of an active annexation movement in part to many who would favor such an effort taking the "easiest and quietest method of securing the benefits of annexation, by themselves silently migrating to the Republic", as more than a million already had.)

Bender believed that Prime Minister John A. Macdonald's promise of a transcontinental railway linking eastern Canada to British Columbia to be overambitious and too expensive, and unfavourably compared the Canadian government's growing debt to the United States' rapid reduction of its Civil War debt. He stated that Canadian businesses would benefit from duty-free access to the American market, while "wondrous American enterprise, supported by illimitable capital" would rapidly prosper Canada, especially its vast undeveloped interior. Bender concluded with pessimism about the likelihood of success of a nation divided in two parts by 1,200 miles of "forbidding, silent wilderness stretching from the head-waters of the Ottawa to Thunder Bay, and thence to Manitoba".

1890s
In 1891, Goldwin Smith posited in his book Canada and the Canadian Question that Canada's eventual annexation by the United States was inevitable, and should be welcomed if Canadians genuinely believed in the ideal of democracy. His view did not receive widespread support.

In January 1893, concerned about Canada's possible annexation, a goal then being pursued by the Continental Union Association, a group of Ontario and Quebec Liberals, Prime Minister Sir John Thompson delivered a speech on tolerance, Canadian nationalism and continued loyalty to Britain. Thompson eventually learned that the desire to make Canada part of the U.S. was confined to a small minority amongst the Liberals.

1900s
In 1901 W. T. Stead, a newspaper editor in London, England,  discussed in The Americanization of the World possible annexations of Canada and Newfoundland. He believed that because of its size and strength Canada would likely be the last of Britain's possessions in the Americas to join the United States. Stead cited several reasons for why he believed annexation seemed "inevitable", however, including rapidly growing economic ties and migration between the two countries, the French Shore, and disputes over the Alaska boundary and fishing rights in the Atlantic.

After the discovery of gold in the Yukon, many Canadians propose to annex parts of Alaska currently controlled by the United States, by calling for a revision in the original map of the boundary line between the Russian Empire and the United States. The US offered to lease the territory but not to give it back. London and Washington agreed on arbitration, with one member of the panel from Canada. In 1903 the Chief Justice of Britain sided with the Americans to resolve the map dispute in favour of the United States.  Many Canadians felt a sense of betrayal on the part of the British government, whose own national interest required close ties to the United States, regardless of the interests of Canada.

The 1932 establishment of the International Peace Garden on the North Dakota–Manitoba border honored the long lasting friendship between the two countries rather than attempts at annexation.

Newfoundland in the mid-20th century
While the Dominion of Newfoundland was still separate from Canada, during World War II, a party known as the Economic Union Party sought closer ties with the United States. However, Canada objected to the possibility, and the British government, which controlled Newfoundland as a colony, would not allow it to consider annexation with the United States in any referendum. Instead, the EUP sought an independent "responsible government" that would then explore American annexation. A referendum showed a plurality in support of independence, but not a majority; a runoff referendum resulted in Newfoundland instead confederating with Canada to become the tenth province.

Modern annexationist groups
Two modern provincial political parties have proposed that their province secede from Canada to join the United States. Neither attracted significant support.

The Unionest Party was a provincial political party in Saskatchewan in 1980 that promoted the union of the western provinces with the United States. It was the most politically successful annexationist group, but its success was both short-lived and extremely limited in scope. The party briefly had two members in the Legislative Assembly of Saskatchewan, both of whom crossed the floor from another party, but dissolved within a few weeks after failing to qualify for official party status.

The original Parti 51 was a short-lived political party in Quebec in the 1980s that advocated Quebec's admission to the United States as the 51st state. The party won just 3,846 votes, or 0.11 percent of the popular vote in the province, in the 1989 election — fewer votes than the Marxist–Leninists or the satirical Lemon Party — and was dissolved the following year. In 2016 Hans Mercier, a pro-American lawyer from Saint-Georges, Quebec, revived the party for a second time. Mercier told La Presse that the times have changed since the party's previous era, as Quebec sovereigntism has waned in popularity. Mercier argued that Americans would be welcoming of a new Quebec state, and pointed to a survey taken during the administration of George W. Bush that suggested nearly 34 per cent of Quebecers would support joining the United States. The revived party ran five candidates and received just 1,117 votes provincewide in the 2018 Quebec general election, representing 0.03 per cent of the provincewide popular vote.

Anti-annexation rhetoric
In modern Canadian political discourse, the idea of Canada becoming the "51st state" of the United States is much more often used as a scare tactic against political courses of action that may be seen as too "Americanizing". The use of this type of rhetoric may occur even if the proponents of such a course of action have not endorsed or proposed annexation.

In the 1911 federal election, the Conservative response to the proposed reciprocity treaty negotiated by the Liberals was to denounce it as equivalent to an American economic takeover, with annexation likely to follow. The parties swapped position in the later 1988 federal election, when the Liberals used the same type of rhetoric to denounce the Progressive Conservatives' proposed Canada–United States Free Trade Agreement, although the Progressive Conservatives won that election and the agreement was implemented.

Annexation fears can be found throughout Canadian History for Dummies, in which humourist Will Ferguson stated that for "John L. O'Sullivan, it was the 'manifest destiny' of the United States to annex and possess all of North America". In fact, O'Sullivan's use of the term never extended beyond potential American annexation of Texas and the Oregon Territory; he explicitly wrote that he did not believe that the United States had a destiny to annex Canada.

Reverse annexation
Political satirists, including the Rhinoceros Party of Canada, have occasionally proposed reverse annexation, whereby all or part the United States would be annexed into an expanded Canadian federation. Following the 2004 American election, some Americans distributed the satirical Jesusland map on the Internet, depicting a similar proposal under which the "blue states" were part of a new political entity called "The United States of Canada". In 2019, there was a petition calling for the United States to sell Montana to Canada to pay off the U.S. debt.

See also
 Indigenous land claims in Canada

Notes

References
 Angus, H. F., and R. M. MacIver; Canada and Her Great Neighbor: Sociological Surveys of Opinions and Attitudes in Canada concerning the United States Toronto: The Ryerson Press, 1938
 Cros, Laurence. "Le Canada et La Peur De L'annexion Americaine a L'epoque Victorienne, a Travers Les Dessins Politiques Canadiens" International Journal of Canadian Studies 2001 (23): 157–186. ISSN 1180-3991; Canadian cartoons often showed Uncle Same as a long, thin, vulture-like individual wearing striped pants and a starred top hat; Belonging to a generation of Victorians both prudish and fascinated by things erotic, Canadian cartoonists of the time took delight in concocting innumerable scenarios according to which Miss Canada would yield, willingly or unwillingly, to Uncle Sam's advances.
 Cumming, Carman. "The Toronto Daily Mail, Edward Farrer, and the Question of Canadian-American Union" Journal of Canadian Studies 1989 24(1): 121–139. ISSN 0021-9495 Campaigned for annexation to protect Anglophone Protestants in Quebec.
   Ellis, L. Ethan.  Reciprocity 1911, A Study in Canadian-American Relations (1939)
 Granatstein, J. L.  Yankee Go Home: Canadians and Anti-Americanism (1997)
 Keenleyside, Hugh,  and Gerald S. Brown; Canada and the United States: Some Aspects of Their Historical Relations NY 1952
 Kilbourn, William. The Firebrand: William Lyon Mackenzie and the Rebellion in Upper Canada Toronto: Clarke, Irwin, 1956 online
 Levitt, Joseph. A Vision Beyond Reach: A Century of Images of Canadian Destiny Ottawa: 1982, twelve eminent Canadian intellectuals discuss annexation
 Little, J. I. "The Short Life of a Local Protest Movement: the Annexation Crisis of 1849-50 in the Eastern Townships." Journal of the Canadian Historical Association  1992 3: 45–67. ISSN 0847-4478
 McNairn, Jeffrey L. "Publius of the North: Tory Republicanism and the American Constitution in Upper Canada, 1848-54." Canadian Historical Review 1996 77(4): 504–537. ISSN 0008-3755
 Neuhold, Hanspeter,  and Harald Von Riekhoff, eds.; Unequal Partners: A Comparative Analysis of Relations between Austria and the Federal Republic of Germany and between Canada and the United States Westview Press. 1993
 Neunherz, Richard E. "'Hemmed In': Reactions in British Columbia to the Purchase of Russian America". Pacific Northwest Quarterly 1989 80(3): 101–111. ISSN 0030-8803
 Nevins, Allan.  Hamilton Fish: The Inner History of the Grant Administration (vol 2 1936) online
 Smith, Allan. Canada, An American Nation?  (1994) intellectual history essays on continentalism and identity
 Smith, Goldwin. Canada and the Canadian Question (Toronto: Macmillan, 1891) online
 Tansill, Charles C. Canadian-American Relations, 1875-1911 (1943)
 Warner; Donald Frederic. The Idea of Continental Union: Agitation for the Annexation of Canada to the United States, 1849-1893 (University of Kentucky Press, 1960) online

Canada–United States relations
National unifications
Political movements in Canada
Political history of Canada
Separatism in Canada
Secessionist organizations in Canada
Pan-Americanism
Irredentism in the United States